Ștefan Ciobanu (born 2 May 1979) is a Romanian professional footballer who plays as a striker for Liga IV side Gloria Albești. In his career Ciobanu played for teams such as Farul Constanța, Delta Tulcea, Astra Ploiești or Săgeata Stejaru, among others.

Honours
Hondor Agigea
Divizia C: Winner (1) 1999–2000

Laminorul Roman
Divizia C: Winner (1) 2003–04

Delta Tulcea
Liga II: Winner (1) 2006–07

Astra Ploiești
Liga III: Winner (1) 2007–08

Pescărușul Sarichioi
Liga IV – Tulcea County: Winner (1) 2016–17
Cupa României – Tulcea County: Winner (1) 2016–17

Medgidia
Liga IV – Constanța County: Winner (1) 2017–18

References

External links
 
 

1979 births
Living people
Sportspeople from Constanța
Romanian footballers
Association football forwards
Liga I players
Liga II players
FCV Farul Constanța players
CSO Plopeni players
CSM Roman (football) players
FC Dinamo București II players
FC Delta Dobrogea Tulcea players
FC Astra Giurgiu players